Let's Touch Wood (French: Touchons du bois) is a 1933 French comedy film directed by Maurice Champreux and starring Jeanne Cheirel, Armand Bernard and Lily Zévaco. It is based on the play The Importance of Being Earnest by Oscar Wilde.

Cast
 Jeanne Cheirel as La générale de Saint-Preux  
 Armand Bernard as Auguste Chantilly  
 Lily Zévaco as Geneviève  
 Suzy Pierson as Minouche 
 Jules Moy as M. Lebigre  
 Roland Armontel as Jacques de Saint-Preux  
 Marcelle Barry as Mlle. Frontin  
 Suzet Maïs as Arlette  
 Suzy Delair as La petite compagne d'amusement  
 Carlos Avril

References

Bibliography 
 Crisp, Colin. Genre, Myth and Convention in the French Cinema, 1929-1939. Indiana University Press, 2002.
 Tanitch, Robert. Oscar Wilde on Stage and Screen. Methuen, 1999.

External links 
 

1933 films
1933 comedy films
French comedy films
1930s French-language films
Films based on The Importance of Being Earnest
Films directed by Maurice Champreux
Gaumont Film Company films
French black-and-white films
1930s French films